The Philippine television mystery music game show I Can See Your Voice premiered the second season on ABS-CBN on August 10, 2019.

This season also aired the first episodes featuring an entire lineup of elderly (with Doris Bigornia) and foreigners (with Ethel Booba) as mystery singers.

Due to the COVID-19 pandemic, production was halted on March 2020. Also the second indefinite network shutdown and denial of franchise then took place, bringing the second season ended prematurely.

Gameplay

Format
Under the original format, the guest artist can eliminate one or two mystery singers after each round. The game concludes with the last mystery singer standing which depends on the outcome of a duet performance with a guest artist.

Rewards
If singer is good, the guest artist wins an award (as Eyeward). The winning singer, regardless of being good (SEE-nger) or bad (SEE-ntunado), wins .

Rounds
Each episode presents the guest artist with six people whose identities and singing voices are kept concealed until they are eliminated to perform on the "stage of truth" or remain in the end to perform the final duet.

Episodes (2019)

Guest artists

SING-vestigators

Episodes (2020)

Guest artists

SING-vestigators

Reception

Television ratings

Source: Kantar Media Philippines

Notes

References

I Can See Your Voice (Philippine game show)
2019 Philippine television seasons
2020 Philippine television seasons
Television series impacted by the COVID-19 pandemic